Halimione pedunculata, the pedunculate sea-purslane, is an annual plant occurring on salty sandy grounds along the seashore. It grows with a standing herbaceous stem up to 30 cm high. The leaves are long and spade shaped. The stipules are triangle shaped to oppositely heart shaped, without spikes, with long petioles.

References

Chenopodioideae